Tricholoma stipitirufescens is an agaric fungus of the genus Tricholoma. Found in Borneo, where it grows on rotten wood and dead trunks in montane forest, it was described as new to science in 1994 by English mycologist E.J.H. Corner.

See also
List of Tricholoma species

References

stipitirufescens
Fungi described in 1994
Fungi of Asia
Taxa named by E. J. H. Corner